The Binks Hess House and Barn are a historic farm property in Marcella, Arkansas.  Located just east of Arkansas Highway 14 on Partee Drive, it is a -story dogtrot house, with a side gable roof, weatherboard siding, and a stone pier foundation.  A single-story porch, supported by square posts, stands in front of the open breezeway section, which is finished in flushboarding, at the center of the east-facing main facade.  An ell extends to the rear.  Behind the house stands the barn, built on a transverse crib plan with side shed-roof additions.  Both house and barn were built about 1871 for Binks Hess, brother of Marcella's founder Thomas.  The barn is believed to be the oldest in Stone County, and the first to use sawn lumber in its construction.

The property was listed on the National Register of Historic Places in 1985.

See also
National Register of Historic Places listings in Stone County, Arkansas

References

Houses on the National Register of Historic Places in Arkansas
Greek Revival houses in Arkansas
Houses completed in 1871
Houses in Stone County, Arkansas
National Register of Historic Places in Stone County, Arkansas